Ice Blues is a 2008 gay-themed mystery television film starring Chad Allen and Sebastian Spence, and directed by Emmy-nominated Canadian-born director Ron Oliver. featuring fictional detective Donald Strachey. It is the third adaptation of a Richard Stevenson novel, though it was the fourth to be released.

Ice Blues was screened in select markets in Canada in the summer of 2008 on the pay station Super Channel, but did not premiere in the United States until September 5, 2008 on here! TV network. The film was nominated for the GLAAD Media Award for Outstanding TV Movie or Limited Series.

Cast

Production notes

Release order
According to Ken Clark, the webmaster of fan site Chad Allen Online, there were a couple of reasons that On the Other Hand, Death was released before Ice Blues.  One was script quality; the producers felt that the adaptation of the novel needed substantial revisions to the overall plot.  The other was the desired weather conditions for shooting, as Ice Blues was meant to take place in winter, so plans to shoot in May 2007 were shelved and filming was postponed until December of that year or the winter season of 2008.

References

External links
 

2008 television films
2008 films
Here TV original programming
English-language Canadian films
American LGBT-related television films
Films based on crime novels
Canadian LGBT-related television films
Films directed by Ron Oliver
American drama television films
Canadian drama television films
2000s American films
2000s Canadian films